The Dominican Republic competed at the 1984 Summer Olympics in Los Angeles, United States.  The nation won its first Olympic medal at these Games.

Medalists

Results by event

Athletics
Men's 5,000 metres
 Ruddy Cornielle
 Heat — 17:16.77 (→ did not advance)

Men's 110 metres hurdles
 Modesto Castillo
 Heat — 14.05 (→ did not advance)

Women's 100 metres
 Divina Estrella
 Heat — 12.25 (→ did not advance)

Boxing
Men's Light Flyweight (– 48 kg)
 Jesús Beltre
 First Round – Bye
 Second Round – Lost to Rafael Ramos (Puerto Rico), 1-4

Men's Bantamweight (– 54 kg)
 Pedro Nolasco →  Bronze Medal
 First Round — Defeated Ljubiša Simič (Yugoslavia), 4-1
 Second Round — Defeated John Siryakibbe (Uganda), 5-0
 Third Round — Defeated Juan Molina (Puerto Rico), 3-2
 Quarterfinals — Defeated Moon Sung-Kil (South Korea), referee stopped contest in first round
 Semifinals — Lost to Maurizio Stecca (Italy), 0-5

Diving
Men's 3m Springboard
 Fernando Henderson
 Preliminary Round — 492.15 (→ did not advance, 19th place)
 Reynaldo Castro
 Preliminary Round — 485.16 (→ did not advance, 20th place)

References
 Official Olympic Reports
 International Olympic Committee results database

Nations at the 1984 Summer Olympics
1984
Oly